Allium aflatunense is a species of plant in the amaryllis family, native to Kazakhstan and Kyrgyzstan in Central Asia. It is commonly grown as a garden plant in other regions.

Description
It flowers in May and June, with seeds ripening in August. It is commonly sold as a bulb.

A. aflatunense is often confused with A. hollandicum.

Cultivation
Allium aflatunense is generally hardy in USDA zones 4–8. The plant is suitable for use as a cut flower. While it prefers alkaline soil, it can tolerate poor soil conditions, as well as part shade (though it does best in full sun).

References

aflatunense
Onions
Flora of Central Asia